Lolenese Usoalii-Hickey is a Samoan New Zealand singer.

Biography 
Usoalii-Hickey was raised in Porirua, New Zealand and moved to Auckland in 1994.

In 1995, she released five singles with Papa Pacific and Warner Music. In 2004, she moved to Samoa and established her own record label, focusing on traditional Samoan music. The same year, she was a founding member of the Pacific Island Music Awards in New Zealand. She also founded the Samoan Music Awards in 2010.

Her song Tu I Luga was used as boxer David Tua's entrance music in his fight against Shane Cameron in 2009.

Awards 
In 1997 she won the New Zealand Music Award for most promising female vocalist. In 2008 she won best female artist at the Pacific Island Music Awards and in 2012 she won best Polynesian female artist worldwide at the first International Polynesian Music Awards.

References

New Zealand people of Samoan descent
Living people
People from Porirua
20th-century New Zealand women singers
Year of birth missing (living people)
21st-century New Zealand women singers